The canton of Grandrieu is an administrative division of the Lozère department, southern France. Its borders were modified at the French canton reorganisation which came into effect in March 2015. Its seat is in Grandrieu.

It consists of the following communes:

Allenc
Arzenc-de-Randon
Badaroux
Bel-Air-Val-d'Ance
Le Born
Chadenet
Châteauneuf-de-Randon
Chaudeyrac
Grandrieu
Laubert
Montbel
La Panouse
Pelouse
Pierrefiche
Sainte-Hélène
Saint-Frézal-d'Albuges
Saint-Jean-la-Fouillouse
Saint-Paul-le-Froid
Saint-Sauveur-de-Ginestoux

References

Cantons of Lozère